Football Club Borgo is a French football club based in Borgo, Haute-Corse on the island of Corsica. The club was founded in July 2017 by the merger of CA Bastia and Borgo FC. As of the 2022–23 season, it competes in the Championnat National.

History 
Upon its creation in 2017, the team began playing in the Championnat National 2, the fourth tier of the French football league system. In the 2018–19 season, the team won promotion as runner-up in its group, one point behind Nantes' reserve team who were ineligible to rise any higher. The team finished in the final relegation place of the 2021–22 Championnat National season, but were reprieved from relegation due to the Direction Nationale du Contrôle de Gestion decision to relegate FC Sète 34.

On 23 July 2022, FC Bastia-Borgo changed its name to FC Borgo ahead of the 2022–23 season.

Crest

Current squad

References

External links
 FC Bastia-Borgo Official Facebook site 

Bastia-Borgo
Bastia-Borgo
2017 establishments in France
Football clubs in France
Sport in Haute-Corse